The 1964 Western Michigan Broncos football team represented Western Michigan University in the Mid-American Conference (MAC) during the 1964 NCAA University Division football season.  In their first season under head coach Bill Doolittle, the Broncos compiled a 3–6 record (2–4 against MAC opponents), finished in fifth place in the MAC, and were outscored by their opponents, 185 to 77.  The team played its home games at Waldo Stadium in Kalamazoo, Michigan.

The team's statistical leaders included Bob Radlinski with 469 passing yards, Troy Allen with 185 rushing yards, and Allen Howze with 94 receiving yards. Quarterback Troy Allen, tackle Paul Rakow, and end Tom Titcomb were the team captains. Center Jim Reid received the team's most outstanding player award.

Bill Doolittle was hired as Western's head football coach on January 20, 1964. He had played quarterback at Ohio State from 1946 to 1948 and was the backfield coach at Army during the 1962 and 1963 seasons.

Schedule

References

Western Michigan
Western Michigan Broncos football seasons
Western Michigan Broncos football